The 2018–19 Penn Quakers men's basketball team represented the University of Pennsylvania in the 2018–19 NCAA Division I men's basketball season. They played their home games at The Palestra in Philadelphia, Pennsylvania and were led by fourth-year head coach Steve Donahue. The Quakers finished the season 19–12, 7–7 in Ivy League play to finish in a three-way tie for fourth place. As the No. 4 seed in the Ivy League tournament, they lost in the semifinals to Harvard.

Previous season
The Quakers finished the 2017–18 season 24–9, 12–2 in Ivy League play to win a share of the Ivy League regular season championship with Harvard. In the Ivy League tournament, they defeated Yale and Harvard to become Ivy League Tournament champions. They received the Ivy League's automatic bid to the NCAA tournament where they lost in the first round to Kansas.

Roster

Schedule and results

|-
!colspan=12 style=| Regular season

|-
!colspan=12 style=| Ivy League tournament
|-

|-

Source

References

Penn Quakers men's basketball seasons
Penn Quakers
Penn Quakers men's basketball team
Penn Quakers men's basketball team